At Seven, commonly stylised as @Seven, was a New Zealand comedy show where Petra Bagust and other comedians present the "real news" from the last 24 hours from New Zealand and the rest of the world. The show replaced Campbell Live, a New Zealand current-affairs program for the Summer Holidays in 2009/2010 whilst Campbell Live took a break. @Seven finished for the 2009/2010 summer holiday break on 22 January 2010 and was replaced with the normal TV3 7pm show, Campbell Live. @Seven did not return the following summer break instead TV3 screened re-runs of Modern Family.

Notable presenters
Ben Hurley (co-host)
Steve Wrigley (fill in)
Dai Henwood (reporter)

Auckland reporters
Steve Wrigley

Australia reporters
Charlie Pickering

Public response
@Seven received mostly bad reviews after the first episode.

Revival
In 2013 TVNZ released a new show with a similar format and name. The new show titled Seven Sharp is screened on TV One weeknights at 7pm replacing long-running current affairs show Close Up. The main difference between @Seven and Seven Sharp is that Seven Sharp is a permanent show screened all year round.

Ratings

@Sevens premiere ratings were lower than the 2008/2009 summer replacement of Campbell Live, The Simpsons.

References

2000s New Zealand television series
2010s New Zealand television series
2009 New Zealand television series debuts
2010 New Zealand television series endings
English-language television shows
New Zealand comedy television series
Three (TV channel) original programming